The 2007 Shelbourne Irish Open was a men's tennis tournament played on outdoor carpet courts. It was the 2nd edition of the event, and part of the 2007 ATP Challenger Series of the 2007 ATP Tour. It took place at the tennis courts at the Fitzwilliam Lawn Tennis Club in Dublin, Ireland, from 2 through 7 July 2007.

Points and prize money

Point distribution

Prize money

* per team

Singles main draw entrants

Seeds

Other entrants
The following players received wildcards into the singles main draw:
  Peter Clarke
  James Cluskey
  John McGahon
  James McGee

The following players received entry from the qualifying draw:
  Colin Ebelthite
  Deniss Pavlovs
  Martin Pedersen
  Ken Skupski

The following players received entry as lucky losers into the singles main draw:
  Pierre-Ludovic Duclos

Doubles main draw entrants

Seeds

Other entrants
The following pairs received wildcards into the doubles main draw:
  Peter Clarke /  James McGee
  James Cluskey /  Ken Skupski
  Fiacra Lennon /  John McGahon

Champions

Singles

  Rohan Bopanna defeated  Martin Pedersen, 6–4, 6–3

Doubles

  Rohan Bopanna /  Adam Feeney defeated  Lars Burgsmüller /  Mischa Zverev, 6–2, 6–2

References

External links
Official Results Archive (ATP)

 Singles Draw (ATP)

 Doubles Draw (ATP)

Irish Open